Hieronymus de Bosch or Jeronimo de Bosch (23 March 1740 in Amsterdam – 1 June 1811 in Leiden) was a Latin poet and notable scholar from the Netherlands. He wrote several books, the most important of which was the "Anthologia Graeca", containing the Anthology of Planudes with Latin translation.

He was a member of Hollandsche Maatschappij der Wetenschappen from 1776, a member of Maatschappij der Nederlandsche Letterkunde from 1780, a member of Zeeuwsch Genootschap der Wetenschappen from 1793, and a member of the Maatschappij ter bevordering van de Landbouw. In 1808 he was asked by Louis Bonaparte to be a member of the committee for the formation of the Koninklijk Instituut along with Martinus van Marum, Jean Henri van Swinden, and Martinus Stuart. He subsequently became member of the institution. His sister married the Haarlem minister and librarian Abraham de Vries. He was the grandfather of the Dutch politician Jeronimo de Bosch Kemper through his daughter, who married Joan Melchior Kemper.

Works
His works were:
Anthologia Graeca cum versione Latina Hugonis Grotii, Hieronymo de Bosch, Ultrajecti e Τypographia B. Wild & J. Altheer, vol. 1, 1795, vol. 2, 1797 vol. 3 1798, vol. 4, 1810 (entitled Observationes in Anthologiam graecam) (and the continuation of his work, after his death: vol 5, 1822 (written by David Jacobus van Lennep, but also bearing de Bosch's name)), containing the Anthology of Planudes and other poems
Bibliotheca Boschiana sive catalogus librorum qui studiis inservierunt viri celeberrimi H*. - 1812
Carmen de aequalitate hominum. - 1793
Dissertatio De Q. Horatii Flacci Epistola Ad Pisones De Arte Poetica. Published in Commentationes Latinae Tertiae Classis Instituti Regii Belgici [Amsterdam, 7 Volumes, 1818-1855]
Curae secundae in Horatii Epistolam ad Pisones de arte poetica e sc*. - 1812
Lofrede op J. R. Deiman. - [1808]
Poemata. - 1803, 1808
Poematum appendix. - 1808
Über Homers Ilias. - 1788
In acerbum funus Nicolai Bondt, 1796
In funere Nicolai Vriesii, 1766

References

1740 births
1811 deaths
Dutch classical scholars
Dutch male poets
New Latin-language poets
18th-century Latin-language writers
19th-century Latin-language writers
Members of the Koninklijke Hollandsche Maatschappij der Wetenschappen
Members of the Royal Netherlands Academy of Arts and Sciences
Writers from Amsterdam